Cosmopterix subsplendens is a moth in the family Cosmopterigidae. It is found in the Russian Far East (Primorye).

References

Natural History Museum Lepidoptera generic names catalog

subsplendens